This article provides details of international football games played by the Estonia national football team from 2020 to present.

Results

2020

2021

2022

2023

Notes

See also
Estonia national football team results (1920–1940)
Estonia national football team results (1991–2009)
Estonia national football team results (2010–2019)

References

External links

Estonia national football team results
2020s in Estonia